Harata Ria Te Uira Solomon  (née Parata; 22 January 1925 – 20 July 1993) was a notable New Zealand  teacher, entertainer, community leader and leader in The Church of Jesus Christ of Latter-day Saints. Of Māori descent, she identified with the Ngati Raukawa, Ngati Toa and Te Ati Awa iwi. She was born in Ōtaki, New Zealand, in 1925. She was a member of the Church of Jesus Christ of Latter-day Saints and was a local leader in the Relief Society.

In the 1990 New Year Honours, Solomon was appointed a Companion of the Queen's Service Order for community service.

References

1925 births
1993 deaths
New Zealand schoolteachers
New Zealand Māori schoolteachers
Ngāti Raukawa people
New Zealand leaders of the Church of Jesus Christ of Latter-day Saints
Ngāti Toa people
Te Āti Awa people
People from Ōtaki, New Zealand
Companions of the Queen's Service Order